Sain Rural District is in the Central District of Sarab County, East Azerbaijan province, Iran. At the National Census of 2006, its population was 3,738 in 714 households. There were 3,467 inhabitants in 881 households at the following census of 2011. At the most recent census of 2016, the population of the rural district was 2,938 in 824 households. The largest of its 28 villages was Kalian, with 423 people.

References 

Sarab County

Rural Districts of East Azerbaijan Province

Populated places in East Azerbaijan Province

Populated places in Sarab County